Magno Mainak is a 2009 crime thriller based on the novel of same name by Sharadindu Bandyopadhyay. It was directed by Swapan Ghosal and produced by New Wave Communications.

This is the third Byomkesh Bakshi film adaptation. Subhrajit Dutta played Byomkesh while Rajarshi Mukherjee played Ajit Kumar Banerjee. Piyali Munshi, Rupanjana Mitra, Gargi Roychowdhury and Biplab Chatterjee acted in other roles.
==

Production
Director Swapan Ghoshal made two Byomkesh Bakshi TV series before this film. Byomkesh Bakshi in 2004 aired on DD Bangla. Another is a short-lived series Byomkesh in 2007, which aired on Tara Muzik. After these successful series Swapan Ghoshal decided to make a full-length feature film. He made it in 2009 with Sharadindu Bandyopadhyay's Magno Mainak adaptation.

References

See also
 Shajarur Kanta (1974 film)
 Byomkesh Bakshi
 Abar Byomkesh
 Byomkesh Phire Elo
 Satyanweshi
 Shajarur Kanta (2015 film)

2009 films
Bengali-language Indian films
Indian detective films
2009 crime thriller films
Byomkesh Bakshi films
Indian crime thriller films
2000s Bengali-language films
Films based on works by Saradindu Bandopadhyay